Panbeh Zar Koti (also Romanized as Panbeh Zār Kotī; also known as Panbehdār Kotī, Panbeh Dār Kotī, Panbeh Zār Kotī, and Panbehzar Koti) is a village in Rudpey-ye Jonubi Rural District, in the Central District of Sari County, Mazandaran Province, Iran. At the 2006 census, its population was 445, in 124 families.

References 

Populated places in Sari County